Óscar Ricardo Rojas (born 5 February 1988) is a Mexican former footballer who last played as a full back for Deportivo Toluca in the Liga MX.

References

External links
 

1988 births
Living people
Footballers from Mexico City
Mexican footballers
Association football forwards
Club Universidad Nacional footballers
Atlante F.C. footballers
Deportivo Toluca F.C. players
Liga MX players